The knockout stage of the 2022 African Nations Championship began on 27 January 2023 with the quarter-finals and ended with the final at the Nelson Mandela Stadium in Algiers on 4 February 2023.

All match times are local, WAT (UTC+1).

Format
Except for the third place play-off, if a match is level at the end of 90 minutes of normal playing time, 30 minutes of extra time will be played with two periods of 15 minutes each. If still tied after extra time, the match will be decided by a penalty shoot-out to determine the winner. In the third place play-off, if the scores remained level after 90 minutes the match would go directly to a penalty shoot-out without extra time.

Qualified teams
Below are the 8 remaining teams of this edition of the tournament which consists of the top two teams from each of groups A, B and C and the top team from groups D and E.

Bracket

Quarter-finals

Algeria vs Ivory Coast

Senegal vs Mauritania

Madagascar vs Mozambique

Niger vs Ghana

Semi-finals

Algeria vs Niger

Senegal vs Madagascar

Third place match

Final

Notes

References

External links
Official 2022 CHAN Home

2022 African Nations Championship
|}